Cody High School is a secondary school in Cody, Wyoming, United States. It is part of Park County School District #6. Cody has a student population of approximately 600 students. The school's mascots are the broncs and fillies, and the colors are blue and gold. The school is the long-time rival of Powell High School.

References

External links
 Cody High School
 Park County School District #6

Schools in Park County, Wyoming
Public high schools in Wyoming
Cody, Wyoming